Chea Sophara (born 20 March 1953) is a Cambodian politician who currently serves as Deputy Prime Minister and Minister of Land Management, Urban Planning and Construction since 2016. From 2008 to 2016, he was Minister of Rural Development. He was also the Governor of Phnom Penh from 1998 to 2003. He is a Member of Parliament for Tbong Khmum Province, since 2018.

Personal life
Sophara has several children, including Chea Sopha Pheaksa, who is married to Tao Seng Huor's daughter Tao Madina, and Chea Sophamaden, who is married to Yim Chhaily's son Yim Leang.

References

1953 births
Living people
People from Kampong Cham province
Deputy Prime Ministers of Cambodia
Cambodian People's Party politicians
Government ministers of Cambodia
Members of the National Assembly (Cambodia)
Governors of Phnom Penh